Frank Lane Wolford (September 2, 1817 – August 2, 1895) was a U.S. Representative from Kentucky.

Wolford was born near Columbia, Kentucky. He attended the common schools, studied law and was admitted to the bar and commenced practice in Liberty, Kentucky. He served as member of the Kentucky House of Representatives in 1847, 1848, 1865, and 1866. During the American Civil War Wolford served in the Union Army as Colonel of the 1st Kentucky Cavalry Regiment which he organized in 1861. In 1864 he was dismissed, and for a time arrested. He served as Adjutant General of the Kentucky militia in 1867 and 1868.

Wolford was elected as a Democrat to the Forty-eighth and Forty-ninth Congresses (March 4, 1883 – March 3, 1887). He was an unsuccessful candidate for reelection to the Fiftieth Congress in 1886. Then he continued the practice of law in Columbia, Kentucky, until his death there on August 2, 1895.
He was interred in Columbia Cemetery.

References

Further reading
Blair, Ronald Wolford. Wild Wolf: The Great Rivalry (Morley, Missori: Acclaim Press), 2015.

External links
 https://kynghistory.ky.gov/Media/Publications/DMA/MilitaryHistoryKY1939AnlRpt.pdf

1817 births
1895 deaths
People from Columbia, Kentucky
Democratic Party members of the United States House of Representatives from Kentucky
People from Liberty, Kentucky
19th-century American politicians
Union Army colonels
Kentucky militia